The Waterhouse Museum was located in Toms River, New Jersey.  The museum exhibited art by Colonel Charles Waterhouse, a U. S. Marine veteran of the Battle of Iwo Jima during World War II.  The works at the museum depicted military scenes from the American Revolutionary War to the present with a focus on the Marine Corps.  When the museum closed, the majority of Waterhouse's body of work was gifted to the United States Marine Corps.

The Museum included:
Colonel's Studio
Conference Gallery
Foyer Gallery
Illustration Gallery
Main Gallery
Studio Gallery

See also
Marine Corps Museums
United States Marine Corps History Division

Notes

External links
USMC Artist Web Site

Art museums and galleries in New Jersey
Marine Corps museums in the United States
Military and war museums in New Jersey
Museums in Ocean County, New Jersey
Art museums established in 2000
2000 establishments in New Jersey
Toms River, New Jersey
Defunct museums in New Jersey